Maplewood Mall is a super-regional shopping mall in  Maplewood, Minnesota, United States. It is two blocks off Interstate 694 on the Saint Paul side of the Twin Cities.  Maplewood Mall opened in 1974. It was later renovated and expanded in 1996 and is thought to be in the top six malls in the metropolitan area in terms of visitors. It is managed by Washington Prime Group out of Columbus, Ohio. Anchor stores are Barnes & Noble, JCPenney, Kohl's, and Macy's with one vacant anchor last occupied by Sears.

The mall was renovated in 2011 with updated entrances, new carpeting and tile, energy-efficient lighting, and updated restrooms. A Metro Transit hub opened near the mall in 2004 and features 425 park and ride stalls.  The mall is open two hours earlier than the stores open to allow people to get exercise by walking in a temperature controlled environment.

In 2015, Sears Holdings spun off 235 of its properties, including the Sears at Maplewood Mall, into Seritage Growth Properties. Sears closed this location in July 2018.

The state of Minnesota has plans for a new bus rapid transit (BRT) line named the "Rush Line" navigating from Downtown Saint Paul and past the Maplewood Mall to White Bear Lake.

History

Maplewood Mall, developed by Homart Development Company, opened in 1974; anchored by Sears and Powers Dry Goods. There were approximately 120 stores in the mall at the time of the grand opening, and included Juster's (a Minneapolis Men's Store), and Field-Schlick (a Saint Paul, Minnesota apparel company).

1996 saw Dayton's open a store at Maplewood Mall, which was the first Dayton's store in the Twin Cities to open since 1978. Dayton's opened in the former Carson's location, and eventually underwent a change in name to Marshall Field's, and now Macy's.

References

External links 

 Official website

Buildings and structures in Ramsey County, Minnesota
Shopping malls established in 1974
1974 establishments in Minnesota
Shopping malls in Minnesota
Tourist attractions in Ramsey County, Minnesota